Intake is a suburb of Doncaster in South Yorkshire, England. The area contains Town Fields, a large area of public land based on Town Moor Avenue. It also contains 'Town Moor' which although contrary to popular belief is part of the Intake ward.
Intake is largely a council estate built on the edge of Doncaster during the prosperous 1950s & 1960s.
Intake is also home to Sandall Beat Woods.

Populated places in South Yorkshire
Geography of Doncaster